"Standing Still" is a song by American singer-songwriter Jewel. Recorded in Nashville, Tennessee, the song was included on her fourth studio album, This Way (2001). Jewel wrote the song sometime after the release of her previous album, Spirit, while she was taking a break from her music career. According to Jewel, the song is about stepping back to avoid stagnation from a busy career and wanting a change of scenery from fame.

"Standing Still" was released on September 24, 2001, to positive reviews and commercial success. In the United States, it peaked at number 25 on the Billboard Hot 100 in February 2002 and reached the top 10 on the Billboard Adult Alternative Songs and Adult Top 40 charts. Worldwide, the single reached the top 40 in Australia, the Netherlands, and New Zealand. In New Zealand, it peaked at number seven and was the 40th-most-successful single of 2002.

Background and release
Jewel revealed the meaning behind "Standing Still" backstage at the 2001 My VH1 Music Awards: "It's about the irony of how much a person travels in my job, and how it can really cause your emotional life to stand still. Fame really tolerates a prolonged adolescence, and your fame and career can outgrow your ability to handle it. You can really spoiled, and I wanted to get away from [that] and make sure I wasn't standing still". She went on to explain that the song was inspired by her three-year hiatus from the music business following the release of Spirit, during which she found it difficult to stay impassioned about her fame. Chuck Taylor of Billboard magazine summarized that the song "addresses simple desires [...] with an underlying message about taking forward steps in life", as well as "stepping out and embracing life".

Jewel recorded the song at three studios in Nashville, Tennessee: Ocean Way Nashville, Emerald Entertainment, and the Sound Kitchen. The song was released to American hot adult contemporary radio on September 24, 2001, and was serviced to contemporary hit radio the following day. In Australia, a CD single was released on October 22, 2001, while in the United Kingdom, a CD single was issued on March 11, 2002.

Composition
"Standing Still" is a folk-pop song. According to the sheet music published at Musicnotes, the song is written in the key of D major and has a moderately fast tempo of 124 beats per minute, in common time. The album version of the song is four minutes and 30 seconds long.

Critical reception
Taylor called "Standing Still" a "jaunty but sophisticated outing, rich in its evolving textures and guitar-fueled folk-pop base".

Chart performance
"Standing Still" first charted on the US Billboard Hot 100 on November 17, 2001, debuting at number 71. After 13 weeks, on the issue of February 16, 2002, it reached its peak of number 25, and it spent a total of 20 weeks in the top 100. It charted the highest on the Billboard Adult Top 40, rising to number three on February 2, 2002, and it peaked inside the top 20 on the Billboard Adult Alternative Songs and Adult Contemporary listings. In addition, it reached number 22 on the Billboard Mainstream Top 40. At the end of 2002, Billboard ranked the track at number 87 on their year-end chart.

The song also found success internationally. In Australia, it debuted at number 39 on the ARIA Singles Chart on November 4, 2001. Two weeks later, it peaked at number 32 and spent eight more nonconsecutive weeks in the top 50. On November 18, 2001, "Standing Still" entered the New Zealand Singles Chart at number 40, reaching its peak of number seven on January 20 and February 10, 2002. It stayed on the listing for 22 weeks and went on to become New Zealand's 40th-most-successful hit of 2002. In Europe, the song peaked at number 32 on the Dutch Top 40, number 11 on Flanders' Ultratip Bubbling Under chart, and number 83 on the UK Singles Chart.

Track listings
US 7-inch single
A. "Standing Still" – 4:29
B. "Grey Matter" (live) – 4:35

European and Australian CD single
 "Standing Still" – 4:30
 "A Long Slow Slide" (live) – 3:50
 "Stephenville, TX" (live) – 4:07

Credits and personnel
Credits are taken from the European CD single liner notes.

Studios
 Recorded at Ocean Way Nashville, Emerald Entertainment, and the Sound Kitchen (Nashville, Tennessee)
 Mixed at Emerald Entertainment (Nashville, Tennessee)
 Mastered at the Mastering Lab (Hollywood, California, US)

Personnel

 Jewel Kilcher – lyrics, music, vocals, production
 Rick Nowels – music
 John Willis – acoustic guitar
 Dann Huff – electric guitar, production
 Jerry McPherson – electric guitar
 Jimmie Sloas – bass
 Chris McHugh – drums
 Eric Darken – percussion
 Tim Akers – keyboards
 Jeff Balding – recording and mixing
 Doug Sax – mastering
 Robert Hadley – mastering
 Lenedra Carroll – executive production
 Ron Shapiro – executive production
 Chad Farmer – art direction and design
 Lambesis Agency – art direction and design
 Ellen von Unwerth – photography

Charts

Weekly charts

Year-end charts

Release history

References

2001 singles
2001 songs
Atlantic Records singles
Jewel (singer) songs
Music videos directed by Darren Grant
Song recordings produced by Dann Huff
Songs written by Jewel (singer)
Songs written by Rick Nowels